The Detroit-Dearborn Motor Car Company was an automobile manufacturer in Dearborn, Michigan.  It was incorporated on August 14, 1909.

The first car was completed in January 1910.  It produced two models: the Minerva, a touring torpedo, and the Nike,  a roadster.  After producing only 110 cars, the company went bankrupt later in 1910 as it had only $50,000 in capital.

Specifications 

 112" wheelbase, 36 x 3 1/2" tires, hickory wheels 
 price $1650.00 F.O.B. Dearborn, Michigan
 35 horsepower, four cylinders (cast in pairs); bore 4 1/8 inches, stroke 4 3/4 inches (253.92 cubic inches); transmission: 3 forward speeds plus reverse
 20-gallon gas tank capacity
 The torpedo body was painted in Holland Blue, with cream striping for body, hood and frame.  Springs and wheels were painted cream with blue striping.  Body panels were made of 5/8" wood, doors were aluminum, and floor and running boards were made of solid oak.

Officers of the company 

 Edward Bland, President
 Arthur E. Kiefer, Vice-President
 Samuel D. Lapham, Treasurer
 Elmer W. Foster, Secretary
 Paul Arthur, Superintendent and Engineer

See also
List of defunct United States automobile manufacturers

References

 
Cars of Class: The Detroit-Dearborn Motor Car Company, William K. McElhone, Michigan History Magazine, November–December 1996 [1-4]
Additional specifications provided by James Skelly, Dearborn, Michigan, from Cycle and Automotive Trade Journal, pages 289-292, as well as a July 1910 Motor magazine advertisement.

Defunct motor vehicle manufacturers of the United States
Motor vehicle manufacturers based in Michigan
Companies based in Wayne County, Michigan
Automobile culture and history in Dearborn, Michigan